Ramnagar  is a village development committee in Nawalparasi District in the Lumbini Zone of southern Nepal. At the time of the 2001 Nepal census it had a population of 12,525 people living in 1,532 individual households.

To promote local culture, Ramnagar has one FM radio, Radio Daunne - 103.4 MHz, which is a community radio station.

References

Populated places in Parasi District